Levy Li Su Lin (Li (李)素琳) (born 20 October 1987) is a Malaysian winner of Miss Malaysia Universe 2008 and represented Malaysia in the Miss Universe beauty pageant held in Vietnam. Levy is a student, model, spokesperson and entrepreneur.

Levy started off her career as a professional model and spokesperson after winning the Miss Malaysia Universe title which was her first participation in a beauty pageant. Levy is actively involved with Malaysia International Fashion Week, Stylo, and MODA.

In 2008, Levy was appointed as Wacoal Malaysia ambassador and in 2009, Levy was appointed as Shiseido Malaysia ambassador.

References

External links
 Official blog

1987 births
Miss Universe 2008 contestants
Living people
People from Selangor
New York Film Academy alumni
Harvard Business School alumni
Malaysian beauty pageant winners
Malaysian people of Chinese descent
Malaysian people of Thai descent